The Colonel John Van Cleve Homestead, also known as the Hopewell Township Poor Farm, features a historic stone house built in 1843 and located at 44–46 Poor Farm Road, northwest of Pennington, in Hopewell Township in Mercer County, New Jersey, United States. The  property was added to the National Register of Historic Places on February 16, 1983, for its significance in architecture and social history.

History and description
The Hopewell Township Poor Farm was established in 1821 on the earlier farmstead. The two and one-half story Poor Farm Main House was built in 1843 using fieldstone. The Poor Farm, an almshouse, operated until 1951. Also contributing to the listing, the Old Van Cleve Farmhouse is a one and one-half fieldstone house, constructed in the mid 18th century. It was the home of Colonel John Van Cleve, an officer in the Hunterdon County Militia during the American Revolutionary War.

See also
National Register of Historic Places listings in Mercer County, New Jersey

References

External links

Hopewell Township, Mercer County, New Jersey
Stone houses in New Jersey		
National Register of Historic Places in Mercer County, New Jersey
Houses in Mercer County, New Jersey
Houses completed in 1843
1843 establishments in New Jersey
New Jersey Register of Historic Places